Thomas Dudley was a magistrate, governor, and one of the founders of the Massachusetts Bay Colony.

Thomas Dudley may also refer to:

 Thomas Dudley (MP) (died 1593), English politician
 Thomas Dudley (engraver), English engraver
 Thomas Haines Dudley, Union agent in London during the American Civil War
 Thomas Underwood Dudley (1837–1904), bishop of Kentucky in the Episcopal Church
 Tom Dudley, ship's captain involved a celebrated 19th century cannibalism trial
 Bang Bang (Dubliner) (1906–1981), real name Thomas Dudley, Dublin eccentric

See also